Oluyemisi Oluremi Obilade (born 14 November 1958) is a Nigerian academic, she is a former vice chancellor of Tai Solarin University of Education.

Life
Obilade was born in Osun State in 1958. She took her first degree in Nigeria before taking her masters at the Harvard Business School in the US and then a doctorate at Judge Business School in Cambridge, United Kingdom.

Professor (Mrs.) Oluwayemisi Oluremi Obilade became the Vice Chancellor of Tai Solarin University of Education (TASUED) in January 2013. She succeeded Professor Segun Awonusi.

References

1958 births
Living people
People from Osun State
Vice-Chancellors of Nigerian universities
Yoruba women academics
Nigerian women academics